Lee Yeongdo (born 1972) is a Korean novelist known for his work in fantasy and science fiction genre. He is best known for his Dragon Raja series of fantasy novels which is also his debut work, serialised on an online forum from 1997 and published on its completion in 1998.

At the time Dragon Raja was first published, Korean readership for fantasy genre(specifically its medievalist form) was considered unsubstantial and unaccounted for by press. But Dragon Raja has sold close to 2 million books in 4 languages.
This was a significant feat for the fantasy genre in Korea where the annual circulation of domestic literature and fiction titles as a whole, ranges between 12~20 million copies.

Dragon Raja's success has prompted a rapid growth of Korean fantasy and science fiction genre, and contributed to the growing acceptance of web fiction, referred to as "Internet literature", both by the country's general public and literary world.

Lee is currently one of the best-selling fantasy writers in Korea.

Background

Early life
Lee was born in 1972 in Busan, South Korea, the first child of two brothers. When Lee was 2 years old, his family moved to Masan in South Gyeongsang Province where he has lived since. As a child he read heavily in various subjects. In 1991 he entered Kyungnam University where he studied Korean language and literature.

He started writing seriously from 1993, but didn't think that he would be writing novels.

Beginnings of the "typer"
Mid-1990s were when fantasy and science fiction literature was just being introduced to Korea. Lee remembered that "if you asked people what is fantasy, they would say 'Isn't that like western martial arts'" in a 2008 interview. He found the genre attractive and decided to try a story with it. It was also when various online service providers similar to CompuServe in United States (but different in its interface being text-only) were emerging. Lee joined one such provider, Hitel, to start posting on its Serial forum what would be the first chapters of Dragon Raja.

Lee serialized Dragon Raja from October 1997 to April 1998, referring to himself as "typer" as he typed and didn't pen his work. The chapters quickly gained popularity and Lee's readers began waiting online for Lee to post the new ones. Lee usually posted his works well after midnight, and Lee's readers began calling themselves zombies, and Lee the Necromancer summoning them online every night.
Through its 6-month running, Dragon Raja accumulated 900,000 hits, and its publishing rights were soon taken by Golden Bough, an imprint of Minumsa Publishing Group. Beginning in May 1998, the novel was published in 12 paperback volumes.

In the midst of his debut success, Lee began typing his second novel Future Walker, a sequel to Dragon Raja. Future Walker was serialised on the same forum from October 1998 to June 1999, and published in August by Golden Bough in 7 paperback volumes.

Lee continued to use Hitel's serial forum for writing his novels such as Polaris Rhapsody, The Bird That Drinks Tears, The Bird That Drinks Blood and a few short stories. All of these stories were published upon completion (and deleted from the forum) or collected in later publications by Golden Bough, which remains Lee's publisher today.

This practice of online serialization and getting published based on its popularity (estimated by the work's view counts) surged in fantasy, science, romance fiction in Korea. Online forums dedicated to these genres opened in hundreds by 2000 attracting prospective writers, and caused the boom of the Internet literature.

Outside the forum he published a short story Over the Horizon as an e-book in 2000, and wrote a series of children's stories for RedPen study books published by Kyowon Co. Ltd.

After Hitel
The popularization of HTTP and the Web browser caused the decline of Hitel and other commercial online services, and Lee's readership on the forum was greatly reduced. But Lee continued to use Hitel forum to 2005, completing The Bird That Drinks Blood, the last of his multi-volume novels as of July 2014.

After the forum was closed in 2007 Lee said in an interview that he was searching for a place to serialize his work online, saying that "the realtime feedback from the readers is a big joy, and I miss that feeling."
But he found it difficult to find a replacement to the old text-only forum, which was "easier for [him] to access because [the forum]'s white text on blue limited one's expression to text, 
and it enabled [him] to show individuality purely through words." The web's increased sense of community and of the writer's presence thereby, made it more difficult for him. "I believe words and people are separate," Lee said, "some people may like a writing and want to find about the writer, but I don't."

Between 2005 and 2008 Lee wrote several short stories for science fiction magazines, including Regarding the Translation of KAIWAPANDOM which has been translated into English.
There were talks of publishing Dragon Raja in the United States in 2006, to which Lee's response was "I don't want to disgrace our country."

Lee's publisher Golden Bough has run an online community from 1999 where the publisher and Lee's fans discuss and actively participate in publication of Lee's current and upcoming works. There the publisher ran limited edition campaigns for Polaris Rhapsody in 2000 and for Dragon Raja 's 10-year anniversary in 2008. In 2011, a campaign for the new hardback edition for Future Walker has been announced. In 2015, a new hardback edition for Polaris Rhapsody was released.

Officially, not much is known about Lee's life outside writing, other than that he helps out at his parents' persimmon farm in his spare time.

Writing (or Typing) 
Since his debut with Dragon Raja Lee became known for his prolific writing, publishing 40 books including 6 novels in 7 years. When asked about his speed in writing, Lee said "it just gets written, and once started I can't contain it and sometimes write as much as [29 pages] a day" but that "each line after line is hard still" nevertheless.

He enjoys intellectual play in his works, constantly twisting words and philosophical concepts. Lee says "the way I like is, even if it becomes difficult, separating what can be separated."

Korean fantasy genre 
Lee is credited as one of the pioneers for fantasy literature in Korea and its growing acceptance by the literary world, due to the political and philosophical discourse and the huge scale of the created world in his works. His own response to this tends to stay non-opinionated.

Lee is quoted to say that "fantasy is better when read as fantasy." He explains this in a Naver interview that "treating The Lord of the Rings as a shoddy allegory to reality and reading it as an example of Orientalism literature where Gandalf the 'White' crowns the returned king of the 'West', would leave a lot of the novels to be missed. (If you admit such, almost outrageous logic, because humanity becomes extincts many times Kurt Vonnegut would be anti-humanism, sadly.)" He explained "fantasy is fantasy, and not the reality's narrow allegories or scary simulacra; it is neither reality in disguise nor does it expel the reality and take its place." Lee described reading fantasy as "going into fantasy to gain something, or to give something, and we simply return to the reality" giving Michael Ende's The Neverending Story as a great example for this. Lee also says being "fantastic" has little to do with the quality of a fantasy work.

Style and major themes 

Lee plays on words and heavily uses defamiliarization, often involving metaphysical conversations among characters. Philosophical discourse plays a major part in the plot of his novels.

Lee's play on words applies to characters' names as well. From Dragon Raja and Future Walker Karl Heltant has a sharp mind and a first name that is a Korean word for knife(칼 kal), while Sanson Percival's hands are strong in battle, or ssen son(센 손). Two brothers in Polaris Rhapsody are named Sopala and Sosara, or Sellcow and Buycow, while another two in The Bird That Drinks Blood are named Saramal and Paramal, or Buyhorse and Sellhorse.

Lee examines and questions human nature, which affects the destiny of human race in his stories. In Dragon Raja series the human race is defined by its power and will to cause change. While other races like elves, dwarves and dragons are defined by their characteristics and strength, they are described to lack the ability to change as humans do. Thus human race is empowered to change the world (in human-centered ways) and to cause its time to go on. This power the humanity has over the world is explored in Future Walker. In Polaris Rhapsody Lee incorporates the humanity's desire for revenge and for freedom in feudal conflicts and pirate wars. This conflict of revenge and freedom also involves Highmasters of Pandamonium, similar to Seven princes of Hell, who cast a vote to decide the human race's destiny.

Lee's novels also investigate religion and politics. In Polaris Rhapsody a Church that is similar to Catholic Church in the Middle Ages coexists with the Highmasters who are heavily involved in the human warfare and politics. Gods play an essential part in the people's life in The Bird That Drinks Tears. The novel's title means someone who would drink the tears of others; the ideal ruler who would take away the sorrows of the people. The concept of an ideal ruler, referred to as "the king(왕), commonly appears in Lee's works. In The Bird That Drinks Tears the human race is characterized by its search for the king, and the sequel The Bird That Drinks Blood is about an empire that one such king has given the birth to. The empire accomplishes peace and order, ruled over by a grand flying capital. The story is told by various characters in different groups, who have different purposes in relation to the empire and its absolute power over people.

Bibliography

Dragon Raja series 
Dragon Raja series consists of 2 multi-volume and 1 single-volume novels, 3 short stories and a children's story. The stories take place in a fictional world on an unnamed continent which draws upon the works of J.R.R. Tolkien in its presence of dragons, elves, orcs, dwarves and halfings, and also upon D&D in its system of magic.
Each novel's stories differ greatly from one to another, the last novel Marks of Shadow taking place a thousands years after Dragon Raja and Future Walker.

Novels 
 Dragon Raja (드래곤 라자) (1998)
 Future Walker (퓨처 워커) (1999)
 Marks of Shadow (그림자 자국 Geurimja Jaguk) (2008)

Short stories 
Collected as A Scene from a Laboratory, these are prequel to Dragon Raja and Future Walker.
 Golem (골렘) (1998)
 Chimera (키메라) (2001)
 The Source of Happiness (행복의 근원, Hængbog-ui Geun-won) (2004)

Children's story 
 Wisdom of the Desert (사막의 지혜, Samag-ui Jihye) (2008) An illustrated book published as a part of Dragon Raja 's 10-year anniversary limited edition.

Bird series 
The Bird series is set in a world of four deities and their four races of chosen people--Nagas, Lekons, Dokkaebis and humans. The series has been acclaimed for its use of old Korean language and allusion to Korean medieval history and mythology in the world's creation.

 The Bird That Drinks Tears (눈물을 마시는 새, Nunmureul masineun sae) (2003)
 The Bird That Drinks Blood (피를 마시는 새, Pireul masineun sae) (2005)

Other novels 
 Polaris Rhapsody (폴라리스 랩소디) (2001)
 Over the Horizon (오버 더 호라이즌) (2004) – Collection of three stories. The first story, Over the Horizon is available in English as an iTunes app.

Short story cycles 

 Spring Is Here (봄이 왔다 Bomi Watda) (2005)
 Regarding the Translation of KAIWAPANDOM (카이와판돔의 번역에 관하여 Ka-i-wapandom-ui Beon-yeog-e Gwanha-yeo) (2005) – English translation available.
 About the Robot that Became A Savior (구세주가 된 로봇에 대하여 Gusejuga doen Robos-e Daeha-yeo) (2006)
 About the Meaning of Teleportation (순간이동의 의미에 대하여 Sungan-idong-ui Uimi-e Daeha-yeo) (2007)
 Regarding Starknitting (별뜨기에 관하여 Byeoltteugi-e Gwanha-yeo) (2008)
 Esoril's Dragon (에소릴의 드래곤 Esoril-ui Deuraegon) (2009)
 Shangpi's Miners (샹파이의 광부들 Syangpai-ui Gwangbu-deul) (2009)

Short story collections 
 Lee Yeongdo's Stories of Fantasy (이영도 판타지 단편집) (2001)
 Over the Horizon: A Collection of Lee Yeongdo's Fantastic Stories (오버 더 호라이즌 – 이영도 환상단편 소설선) (2004)

Other short stories 
 Mysterious Stories (신비로운 이야기 Sinbilo-un i-yagi) (2000)
 The Eye Looking at Me (나를 보는 눈 Nareul Boneun Nun) (2008)

Adaptations

Dragon Raja Online 
Lee's Dragon Raja world and its main characters have been used as a basis for a MMORPG, Dragon Raja Online, or DRO. The game began development in 1998 with the investment by Samsung Electronics, and was released in 2000 in South Korea, and later in 10 countries including Taiwan and China as 龍族.
where the novel was published in the same title and marketed along with the game.
After a series of M&A of its developing company over the years, DRO's Korean service was closed in 2011. The English version of the game however, can be accessed at here and the global service has remained live. (August 2011)

Dragon Raja Mobile 
In 2004 a mobile RPG Dragon Raja Mobile, or DRM, was released through KTF's mobile game services. The game's storyline of 15-hours playtime on average, was based on the beginning chapters of the novel.

In Dec. 2015, LOCOJOY International announced a "3D action RPG" was in development by Vision Bros, a Korean mobile developer, and would be released in the 1st quarter of 2016. A closed "final test" beta was announced and players could register using their mobile phone numbers. The beta began on 1 January 2016 and ended on 5 January 2016.
The game Dragon Raja M was released on Google Play for Android on 11 February 2016.

Illustrated novels
The Japanese edition of Dragon Raja and Future Walker are illustrated by Eiji Kaneda who is known for his works for the anime series Genesis of Aquarion.

The online versions of Lee's short stories  Regarding the Translation of KAIWAPANDOM and Regarding Starknitting include a few illustrations.

Comic books
Dragon Raja was an inspiration for a series of comic books by Son Bong-gyu of the same title.
Lee's short story About the Robot that Became a Savior was adapted into a short comic by Onesound

Radio
Dragon Raja was adopted as a part of KBS Radio 2's Fantasy Express program, and the total of 83 episodes ran in 2001.

References

External links

 Lee Yeongdo's official publishing community (Korean)
 Lee Yeongdo's short stories on Naver Cast (Korean)
 Over the Horizon English iTunes book app.
 Regarding Translation of KAIWAPANDOM English translation.

Living people
1972 births
South Korean fantasy writers
South Korean science fiction writers